Closed Exit (German: Gesperrte Wege, Spanish: Camino cortado) is a 1955 German-Spanish crime film directed by Ignacio F. Iquino and starring Viktor Staal, Laya Raki and Albert Matterstock.

Cast
 Viktor Staal as Juan  
 Laya Raki as Cecilia  
 Albert Matterstock as Policía  
 Franz Muxeneder as Ayudante dueño garito  
 Armando Moreno as Miguel 
 Eugenio Testa 
 Eugenio Domingo as Antonio  
 Manuel Otaola as Guardia Civil 
 Juan Albert as Antonio  
 Enrique Fernández as Locutor (voice)  
 Ramón Hernández as Portero  
 Concha Ledesma as Bailarina  
 José Ocón de Eslava as Coronel de la Guardia Civil  
 Ramón Quadreny as Pastor  
 Joaquín Soler Serrano as Locutor (voice)  
 Josefina Tapias as Vendedora de flores  
 Miguel Ángel Valdivieso as Locutor (voice)  
 Mahnahén Velasco as Cantante

References

Bibliography 
 Bentley, Bernard. A Companion to Spanish Cinema. Boydell & Brewer 2008.

External links 
 

1950s crime thriller films
Spanish crime thriller films
German crime thriller films
1955 films
West German films
1950s Spanish-language films
Films directed by Ignacio F. Iquino
1950s chase films
Films with screenplays by Ignacio F. Iquino
Films produced by Ignacio F. Iquino
Films scored by Augusto Algueró
German black-and-white films
Spanish black-and-white films
1950s Spanish films
1950s German films